Pa Chenar (also Romanized Pā Chenār; also known as  Pāchinār, Paichmar, Pāychenār, and Paychinar) is a village in Kalashtar Rural District, in the Central District of Rudbar County, Gilan Province, Iran. At the 2006 census, its population was 370, in 93 families.

References 

Populated places in Rudbar County